Luisa Stefani and Taylor Townsend defeated Anastasia Pavlyuchenkova and Elena Rybakina in the final, 7–5, 7–6(7–3), to win the women's doubles tennis title at the 2023 Adelaide International 2. It was their first title as a team.

Eri Hozumi and Makoto Ninomiya were the reigning champions from 2022, when the event was a WTA 250 tournament, but chose to compete in Hobart instead.

Seeds

Draw

Draw

References

External links
Main draw

Adelaide International 2 - Doubles
2023 Women's Doubles 2
Adelaide International 2